Alex Steeves (born December 10, 1999) is an American professional ice hockey forward. He is currently playing with the Toronto Marlies in the American Hockey League (AHL) as a prospect to the Toronto Maple Leafs of the National Hockey League (NHL).

Early life
Steeves was born on December 10, 1999, in St. Paul, Minnesota to parents Alison and Glen Steeves. Steeves and his brothers were born in St. Paul before the family moved to New Hampshire so their father could complete his residency. Steeves spent his formative years in New Hampshire where his Canadian-born parents encouraged him to play ice hockey. His father played in the Western Major Junior Hockey League and spent four years playing hockey at the University of Manitoba. As a result, Steeve described himself as being "literally born with hockey in my blood."

Playing career
Growing up in New Hampshire, Steeves played for the Manchester Jr. Monarchs 16U, New Hampshire Jr. Monarchs 18U, and the EHL New Hampshire Jr. Monarchs.

After going undrafted for two drafts and playing for the Notre Dame Fighting Irish, Steeves was signed as an unrestricted free agent by the Maple Leafs on March 28, 2021. He made his NHL debut with the club on December 7 in a game against the Columbus Blue Jackets. Steeves recorded his first NHL point in his third game on December 11, picking up an assist on a goal scored by teammate Pierre Engvall in a 5–4 win over the Chicago Blackhawks. Steeves would spend the majority of his first professional season with the Toronto Marlies of the American Hockey League, the Maple Leafs' top tier affiliate club. Steeves would score 23 goals, the second most in franchise history for a rookie (tying Josh Leivo). Steeves was in a race with teammate and fellow rookie Bobby McMann for the second half of the season for the franchise rookie scoring title; McMann would ultimately score 24 goals to assume the record.

Career statistics

Awards and honours

References

External links
 

1999 births
Living people
American men's ice hockey forwards
Dubuque Fighting Saints players
Notre Dame Fighting Irish men's ice hockey players
Sioux City Musketeers players
Toronto Maple Leafs players
Toronto Marlies players
Undrafted National Hockey League players